Bertrand Blier (born 14 March 1939) is a French film director and writer. His 1978 film Get Out Your Handkerchiefs won the Academy Award for Best Foreign Language Film at the 51st Academy Awards.

He is the son of famous French actor Bernard Blier. His 1996 film Mon Homme was entered into the 46th Berlin International Film Festival. His 2005 film How Much Do You Love Me? was entered into the 28th Moscow International Film Festival where he won the Silver George for Best Director.

A defence of Blier's work until 2000 was written by Sue Harris, Queen Mary College, London and published in 2001  by Manchester University Press.

Personal life
With his former wife Françoise, to whom he was married for twenty years, he has a daughter named Béatrice. He also has a son, Léonard, born 1993, with actress Anouk Grinberg. He is married to actress Farida Rahouadj, with whom he has a daughter named Leila.

Filmography

Theatre 
 1997: Les Côtelettes
 2010: Désolé pour la moquette...

Published works 
 1972: Les Valseuses
 1979: Buffet Froid
 1981: Beau-père 
 1997: Les Côtelettes 
 1998: Existe en blanc
 2001: Pensées, répliques et anecdotes 
 2010: Désolé pour la moquette...

References

External links

 

1939 births
Living people
French film directors
French male screenwriters
French screenwriters
Directors of Best Foreign Language Film Academy Award winners
Best Director César Award winners
People from Boulogne-Billancourt